The Dead & Company Summer Tour 2017 was a concert tour by the rock band Dead & Company during May, June, and July 2017. It was the band’s third tour, following their 2016 tour. The Dead & Company Summer Tour 2017 took place between May 27 and July 1, 2017, comprising a total of 20 concerts in 15 different cities.

Tour dates
The band performed a total of 20 concerts in 15 different U.S. cities.

Musicians
Mickey Hart – drums, percussion
Bill Kreutzmann – drums
John Mayer – lead guitar, lead/backing vocals
Bob Weir – rhythm guitar, lead/backing vocals
Oteil Burbridge – bass guitar, percussion, lead/backing vocals
Jeff Chimenti – keyboards, backing vocals

See also
 Reunions of the Grateful Dead

References

External links
Dead & Company official website

2017 concert tours
Dead & Company concert tours